Keen Mountain is an unincorporated community in Buchanan County, Virginia located on U.S. Route 460, just south of the community of Oakwood, Virginia.

The Keen Mountain post office was established in 1937. The community was named in honor of William Keen and family, pioneer settlers.

References

Unincorporated communities in Buchanan County, Virginia
Unincorporated communities in Virginia